South Seaville is an unincorporated community located within Dennis Township in Cape May County, New Jersey, United States. South Seaville has a post office with ZIP code 08246.

A post office was established in 1867, with Remington Corson as the first postmaster.

Demographics

Education
As with other parts of Dennis Township, the area is zoned to Dennis Township Public Schools (for grades K-8) and Middle Township Public Schools (for high school). The latter operates Middle Township High School.

Countywide schools include Cape May County Technical High School and Cape May County Special Services School District.

References

Dennis Township, New Jersey
Unincorporated communities in Cape May County, New Jersey
Unincorporated communities in New Jersey